Peggy Kopp Arenas is a pageant titleholder, was born in Caracas, Venezuela on April 3, 1951. She is the Miss Venezuela titleholder for 1968, and was the official representative of Venezuela to the Miss Universe 1968 pageant held in Miami Beach, Florida, United States, on July 13, 1968, when she won the title of 3rd Runner Up.

References

External links
Miss Venezuela Official Website
Miss Universe Official Website

1951 births
Living people
Miss Universe 1968 contestants
Miss Venezuela winners
People from Caracas